The Gates Shopping Centre (formerly known as Milburngate Shopping Centre) was a shopping centre in Durham, England. It was located on the west side of the River Wear between Framwellgate Bridge and Milburngate Bridge, in the centre of Durham.

In 2016 the centre closed for a £30 million redevelopment, as one of the three redevelopments in Durham City, in partnership with Durham BID worth almost £190 million. The complex being built on the former site of The Gates named the Riverwalk was opened in Summer 2019 and consists of over 20 refurbished shopping units, including Poundland, Cex (pre-existing unit) and Santander. The Riverwalk complex also has a large Odeon Cinema. Free parking for vehicles was introduced in summer 2020.

References

External links
The Gates Official website (Archive)

Buildings and structures in Durham, England
Shopping malls established in 1975
Shopping centres in County Durham
1975 establishments in England